Garden Township is a township in Cherokee County, Kansas, USA.  As of the 2000 census, its population was 3,039.

Geography
According to the USGS, it contains five cemeteries: Faith Community Church, Gandy, Lowell, Pence and Quaker Valley.

The stream of Shoal Creek runs through this township.

References
 USGS Geographic Names Information System (GNIS)

External links
 City-Data.com

Townships in Cherokee County, Kansas
Townships in Kansas